Meridian Street is the name of a street in several cities and towns, including:

 Meridian Street (Indianapolis), Indiana
 Washington State Route 539, Meridian Street in Bellingham, Washington